Stephen Wayne Bedrosian (born December 6, 1957) is an American former Major League Baseball player. Nicknamed "Bedrock", he played from 1981 to 1995 with the Atlanta Braves, Philadelphia Phillies, San Francisco Giants, and Minnesota Twins. Bedrosian won the 1987  National League Cy Young Award. He is the father of Major League Baseball pitcher Cam Bedrosian.

Biography 
At the University of New Haven, Bedrosian put up a career record of 13–3 and 3 saves. He helped the Chargers to a third-place finish in the 1978 division two College World Series. He was then drafted by the Atlanta Braves in the 1978 MLB draft.

In 1985, his only full season as a starter, Bedrosian went 7–15 and set a Major League record for most starts in a single season without a complete game (37).

Bedrosian was traded by the Braves to the Phillies in the off-season and was converted to a reliever before the 1986 season. In his first year in relief, he saved 29 games. His best season came in 1987 when he posted a 5–3 record for the Phillies with a 2.83 earned run average, recorded a league-leading 40 saves, and was named the National League Cy Young Award winner. Since Bedrosian, only three other relievers (Mark Davis, Dennis Eckersley and Éric Gagné) have won Cy Young honors.

He was traded to the Giants during the 1989 season to help their pennant drive that year. In 1990, he won the Willie Mac Award, voted upon by his teammates, honoring his spirit and leadership (his then two-year-old son Cody was battling leukemia).

As a member of the Minnesota Twins, Bedrosian won his only World Series ring in the 1991 World Series, which the Twins won in seven games over his former team, the Atlanta Braves.

Personal
Currently, Bedrosian resides in Newnan, Georgia, where he served on the Coweta County Board of Education, through 2010, and is an assistant baseball coach at East Coweta High School.

In 2008, Bedrosian was inducted into the Coweta Sports Hall of Fame. Bedrosian has also been inducted into the University of New Haven Hall of Fame.

Bedrosian is of Armenian descent.

See also
List of Major League Baseball annual saves leaders
List of second-generation Major League Baseball players

References

External links

Steve Bedrosian at Baseball Almanac

1957 births
Living people
New Haven Chargers baseball players
American people of Armenian descent
Atlanta Braves players
Philadelphia Phillies players
San Francisco Giants players
Minnesota Twins players
Major League Baseball pitchers
Cy Young Award winners
National League All-Stars
National League saves champions
Baseball players from Massachusetts
Sportspeople from Essex County, Massachusetts
People from Methuen, Massachusetts
Sportspeople from the Atlanta metropolitan area
People from Newnan, Georgia
Kingsport Braves players
Greenwood Braves players
Savannah Braves players
Richmond Braves players
Maine Phillies players
Ethnic Armenian sportspeople